Amit Bhargav is an Indian actor who has appeared in films and television shows in Tamil, Kannada, and Hindi. He became popular for his role in the Kannada television series Seethe in which he played Lord Rama. He was noted for his short role in Abhishek Verman's 2 States (2014). He is most known for his role as Arjun in the Tamil television series Kalyanam Mudhal Kadhal Varai. He went on to perform supporting roles in Tamil films, including Yennai Arindhaal (2015), Miruthan (2016) and Aranmanai 3 (2021). He has also voiced for characters in both Kannada and Tamil productions.

Television

Web series

Filmography

As Dubbing artist

Awards and honours

References

External links

Kannada people
Living people
Male actors from Bangalore
Male actors in Tamil cinema
Indian male television actors
Tamil male television actors
Male actors in Hindi cinema
Indian male voice actors
Male actors in Kannada cinema
21st-century Indian male actors
Indian male film actors
Tamil Reality dancing competition contestants
1989 births